Johnny Richard Carson, Sr. (January 31, 1930 – April 1, 2009) was a professional American football tight end for the Washington Redskins of the National Football League (NFL) from 1953 to 1959.  He also played for the Houston Oilers of the American Football League (AFL) during their inaugural season in 1960.  He played college football at the University of Georgia, where he was an All-American.  Carson was drafted in the fifteenth round of the 1953 NFL Draft by the Cleveland Browns.

He died Wednesday, April 1, 2009 at Abbey Hospice in Social Circle.

See also
 List of NCAA major college football yearly receiving leaders

References

1930 births
2009 deaths
American football tight ends
Georgia Bulldogs football players
Washington Redskins players
Houston Oilers players
Eastern Conference Pro Bowl players
Players of American football from Atlanta
American Football League players